Abū al-Sābigha Shamir ibn Dhī al-Jawshan, often known as Shamir or Shimr, was an Arab military commander from Kufa who killed Husayn ibn Ali, the grandson of the Islamic prophet Muhammad, at the Battle of Karbala in 680.

Life
Shimr was a son of Shurahbil (or Aws) Dhi al-Jawshan ibn Qurt al-A'war ibn Amr, a companion of the Islamic prophet Muhammad, who settled in Kufa after the Muslim conquest of Iraq. He was from the Mu'awiya al-Dibab clan of the Banu Kilab, branch of the Qaysid tribe of Banu Amir. Shimr was originally an ally of Caliph Ali and fought against Mu'awiya, the governor of Syria and future founder of the Umayyad Caliphate, at the Battle of Siffin, where he received a head wound. He later defected to the Umayyads. When Ziyad ibn Abihi arrested the pro-Alid Hujr ibn Adi on the charge of treason in 671, Shimr was among those who testified against Hujr. 

In 680, Husayn ibn Ali, a grandson of Muhammad and son of caliph Ali, sent his cousin Muslim ibn Aqil to Kufa in response to calls from the pro-Alids to overthrow the Umayyads. Shimr, along with various other tribal notables, aided the governor Ubayd Allah ibn Ziyad in quelling the rebellion. Shortly afterwards, Husayn arrived in Iraq and was intercepted in the desert of Karbala outside of Kufa. After Ibn Ziyad consented to a peace proposal from Husayn, Shimr reportedly opposed the proposal and convinced Ibn Ziyad to subdue Husayn with force. Shimr was subsequently sent to Karbala with orders to either force Husayn into submission or to kill him in case of refusal. A day before the battle, Shimr offered safe conduct to three paternal brothers of Husayn, including Abbas ibn Ali, whose mother, Umm al-Banin, was from the tribe of Shimr. The offer was declined because Husayn was not offered any safe conduct. On the battle day (10 October), Shimr commanded the left wing of the Umayyad army. Upon the orders of the commander of the army, Umar ibn Sa'd, Shimr set on fire the tents of Husayn's companions, and was intent on burning Husayn's personal tent before being prevented by his own comrades.

After a day of conflict, Husayn suffered many casualties, but the Umayyad soldiers hesitated to kill Husayn. Shimr encouraged them to kill him with the following quote: "Shame on you! Why are you waiting for the man? Kill him, may your mothers be deprived of you!" Shimr then led the final assault. Some accounts name him as the one who ultimately killed and decapitated Husayn, while other accounts name Sinan ibn Anas. He then attempted to kill Husayn's surviving son Ali Zayn al Abidin, but was prevented by Ibn Sa'd. Afterwards, Shimr led the escort carrying the heads of the dead to Kufa. Later he accompanied the prisoners to Syria. He is reported to have regretted his actions later in his life.

During the rule of Mukhtar al-Thaqafi, who had seized Kufa in October 685, Shimr was among the agitators who attempted to topple Mukhtar. After the rebellion was defeated, Shimr escaped to Sadama, a place between Kufa and Basra. Mus'ab ibn al-Zubayr ruled Basra at the time and Shimr wrote him a letter requesting assistance. The letter was intercepted by Mukhtar's soldiers led by Abu Amra Kaysan. With his location thus exposed, Shimr was found and killed. Other variants suggest that he was wounded and sent to Mukhtar, who then killed him.

Descendants
After Shimr was killed his sons left Kufa for the Jazira. Shimr's grandson al-Sumayl ibn Hatim was a commander in the Umayyad army of Balj ibn Bishr sent against the Berber Revolt in North Africa in 742 and became a leader of the Kilabi troops settled in al-Andalus thereafter.

Depiction 
Shimr is depicted usually wearing red with a long feathered cap in the passion plays during the Shia mourning remembrance of Ashura.

See also 
 Hurmala
 Amr ibn Hishām

References

Sources

7th-century Arabs
Banu Kilab
Battle of Karbala